Cochylimorpha psalmophanes is a species of moth of the family Tortricidae. It is found in Egypt.

The larvae feed on Artemisia judaica.

References

Moths described in 1925
Cochylimorpha
Moths of Africa